The new Parisienne: the women & ideas shaping Paris is a 2020 non-fiction book written by New York Times journalist Lindsey Tramuta and with photography by Joann Pai. It was originally slated to release in April 2020, but was pushed to July later that year due to the COVID-19 pandemic and the murder of George Floyd. It features profiles of 40 Parisian women, including activists, writers, and chefs, among other occupations.

Summary 
The summary from Abrams Books is:

Book contents 
The book is divided up into seven sections:

The Activists

 Lauren Bastide: journalist & podcaster
 Elisa Rojas: lawyer & disability-rights activist
 Rokhaya Diallo: journalist, filmmaker & antiracist activist
 Rebecca Amsellem: author & creator of Les Glorieuses
 Clémence Zamora Cruz: Inter-LGBT spokesperson & trans activist

The Creators

 Aline Asmar D'Amman: architect & designer
 Elena Rossini: filmmaker & cinematographer
 Inna Modja: singer-songwriter
 Amélie Viaene: fine jewelry designer 
 Ajiri Aki: founder of Madame de la Maison
 Victoire de Taillac: cofounder of L'Officine Universelle Buly

The Disruptors

 Anne Hidalgo: first female mayor of Paris
 Christelle Delarue: CEO, Mad&Women advertising agency
 Delphine Dijoud: aeronautical engineer
 Sarah Zouak: social entrepreneur, filmmaker & cofounder of Lallab
 Delphine Horvilleur: rabbi & author
 Dr. Ghada Hatem-Gantzer: Ob-gyn & founder of La Maison des Femmes
 Sarah Ourahmoune: Olympic-medalist boxer & entrepreneur

The Storytellers

 Ariane Bernard: former head of digital at Le Parisien
 Heidi Evans: creator of Women of Paris tours
 Leïla Slimani: Goncourt Prize-winning author
 Sarah Sauquet: teacher & creator of Un Texte Un Jour
 Nathalie Miltat: art gallery owner
 Poonam Chawla: cultural guide, author & translator

The "Taste"makers

 Mihaela Iordache: coffee roaster
 Muriel Tallandier: publisher & cofounder of Fou de Pâtisserie boutique
 Julie Mathieu: editor in chief & co-owner of Fou de Pâtisserie magazine & boutique
 Myriam Sabet: pastry chef & founder of Maison Aleph 
 Margot Lecarpentier: cofounder of Combat cocktail bar
 Moko Hirayama: baker & co-owner of Mokonuts

The Visionaries

 Alice Cabaret: urban strategist & founder of The Street Society
 Rahaf Harfoush: digital anthropologist & author
 Sandra Rey: designer in bioluminescence & CEO of Glowee
 Kat Borlongan: director of La French Tech
 Nida Januskis: associate dean of advancement for INSEAD
 Anne Ravanona: founder of Global Invest Her

Their Paris

 Sarah Andelman: cofounder of Colette & Just an Idea
 Eliane Cheung: illustrator-author 
 Benedicte Reitzel-Nielsen: cofounder of the #SeeMyParis community
 Céline Pham: itinerant chef cofounder of Tontine
 Emilie Franzo: food photographer cookbook author

References 

Books about Paris
Women in Paris
21st-century French women
2020 non-fiction books
American non-fiction books
Abrams Books books